Lion Scout can refer to several ranks in Scout organizations around the world:

 Lion Scout, the highest rank in The Kenya Scouts Association
 Lion Scout, the highest rank in the Iran Scout Organization until 1979
 Lion Scout rank in the Scouts of China
 Lion Scout, a rank in the Cub Scouting program of the Boy Scouts of America